Robert Hines or Bob Hines may refer to:
 Robert Hines (astronaut) (born 1975), American astronaut
 Robert Hines (boxer) (born 1961), American boxer
 Robert L. Hines (born 1970), American comedian and actor
 Robert W. Hines (1912–1994), American wildlife artist
 Bo Hines (born 1995), American politician

See also
Bob Heinz (born 1947), American football player